Mahmoud Khatami (Persian: محمود خاتمی; born 1962 or 1963) is an Iranian philosopher.

Life
Mahmoud Khatami grew up in Tehran. Showing an early interest in humanities, he attended the Seminary of Islamic Studies, which gained him the traditional degree of Ijtihad, the highest level in Islamic religious and theological learning. Concurrently, he attended the University of Tehran to pursue his secular education for the BA, MA and MS degrees. He also received two PhD degrees in philosophy from Iranian institutions, one in 1987 and one in 1992. Afterwards, he furthered his education in England, where he was awarded a further PhD in the field of Philosophical Psychology at the University of Durham in 1996.

Returning to Iran, he was appointed to the  Department of Philosophy at University of Tehran in 1997 where he is now a Professor of Contemporary Philosophy. In 2002, he was made a Fellow of Iran's Academy of the Arts. He as served as a visiting professor at other Iranian and Western universities, and has received awards for his academic excellence both inside and outside Iran.

In 2014, he was accused of plagiarism. The journal Topoi retracted one of his articles and the journal editor discussed Khatami's plagiarism in an editorial.

See also 

 Martin Heidegger
 Mulla Sadra
 Immanuel Kant
 Islamic philosophy
 Iranian Philosophy

References

External links
 Faculty of Human sciences, University of Tehran
 Mahmoud Khatami, a brief bio
 Mahmoud Khatami
 Mahmoud Khatami

21st-century Iranian philosophers
Islamic philosophers
Living people
Alumni of Durham University
University of Tehran alumni
Heidegger scholars
Phenomenologists
People involved in plagiarism controversies
People involved in scientific misconduct incidents
1960s births
Year of birth uncertain
Faculty of Theology and Islamic Studies of the University of Tehran alumni
Faculty of Letters and Humanities of the University of Tehran alumni